The Crosman model 1322 Medalist .22 Caliber Pellet Air Pistol was a single-shot, bolt-action loading, pneumatic pump-action .22-caliber air pistol, featuring a button-rifled 10.1-in. (256 mm) steel barrel and checkered plastic grips.  The 1322 was introduced in 1977 by Crosman as a general-purpose air pistol for target practice and small game hunting.  It was in production, in three separate manufacturing versions, until 2004, when it was discontinued from sale in the U.S.A. In 2012 the gun has been reintroduced by Crosman.

Design and Operation
The Model 1322 is a pneumatic pump-action air pistol utilizing .22 (5.5 mm) caliber lead pellets. The pistol's integral pump lever mechanism is located underneath the barrel, integral to the forearm. This pump lever is cycled a variable number of times (up to a maximum of ten strokes) to store increasingly pressurized air in a chamber. When the trigger is activated, an air valve dumps the pressurized air into a transfer port integral to the breech, discharging the pellet from the barrel. The Model 1322 features fully adjustable square notch rear and front fixed blade sights.

The Model 1322 was a development of the earlier Crosman Model 1300 Medalist II in .22 caliber, produced from 1970-1976.  The Model 1322 was first introduced in 1977, and was produced over its lifetime in three distinct variants: Type I, 1977–81, Type II, made from 1978-1996, and Type III, 1998-2004.  Type I featured a sliding metal breech cover, manual cocking using a three-ring external cocking knob, and a steel breech.  The Type II adopted a plastic breech in place of the original steel version.  The Type III dropped the external cocking knob and breech cover of prior types in favor of a brass bolt action mechanism that integrated loading and cocking functions.

While the Model 1322 was not designed as a competition-level target airgun, its long rifled barrel makes the Model 1322 surprisingly accurate for a mass-produced air pistol.  Its accuracy can be further enhanced with precision sights and other modifications.

Accessories and options
In 1981, a composite skeletonized shoulder stock (Model 1399) was introduced as a factory option by Crosman, converting the pistol into a carbine.  In 1985, Crosman began offering a pistol scope and mount to fit the Models 1322 and 1377.

The Model 1322 is noted for its versatility and ease of modification.  Many factory and aftermarket parts are available for the 1322, including match-grade or custom-length barrels, steel breeches (receivers) suited for mounting optical sights, wide triggers, barrel- and receiver-mounted scope rings, custom and high-output air valves, wood and composite grips and stocks, and other components.

Crosman reintroduced the Model 1322 with black grips in January 2012.

See also
Crosman
Crosman Nightstalker

References

Pneumatic weapons